The Revolt of the Angels is a 1914 novel by Anatole France.

Plot
Revolt retells the classic Christian story of the war in heaven between angels led by the Archangel Michael against others led by Satan. The war ends with the defeat and casting to the earth of the latter. The plot emphasises themes of protagonists fighting a ruling hierarchy, and attempting to escape it, as well as "hiddenness, delusion, revolution, and epiphany...a literary exploration of existential choices in an apocalyptic context". It is written, says René Boylesve, with a "deft levity". Mutual antagonism between God and his angels is emphasised, which leads to disgruntlement and ultimately rebellion by the latter.

It tells the story of Arcade, the guardian angel of Maurice d'Esparvieu. Bored because Bishop d'Esparvieu is sinless, Arcade begins reading the bishop's books on theology and becomes an atheist. He moves to Paris, meets a woman, falls in love, and loses his virginity causing his wings to fall off, joins the revolutionary movement of fallen angels, and meets the Devil, who realizes that if he overthrew God, he would become just like God. Arcade realizes that replacing God with another is meaningless unless "in ourselves and in ourselves alone we attack and destroy Ialdabaoth." "Ialdabaoth", according to France, is God's secret name and means "the child who wanders".

Political influences
France's political leanings—he was a socialist—heavily influenced Revolt, leading the theme that successful revolutions must always create greater tyrannies than those they overthrew. The bitterness created by the revolt is reflected in the "biting and harsh" descriptions. Joe Loewenberg has described it as an "imaginative narrative...the ripest expression of Anatole France's urbane genius, [being] a masterpiece of criticism at once ironic and irenic".

Literary references
Essayist David Fuchs argues that much of Ernest Hemingway's early work suggests that he was probably aware of the book, even if he had not read it. F. Scott Fitzgerald references "Revolt of the Angels" in his early story Dancing with a Ghost. Fitzgerald also uses the book as a prop in his story "The Offshore Pirate"; the character Ardita is reading Revolt, herself looking, says Griffin, "conically angelic...reading a book about angels ". Fitzgerald draws attention to Revolt five times in the story; he argues that France's work is the more romantic of the two. Revolt has been compared with the work of George Santayana in its suggestion that religion is set back by its successes. Henry Miller mentions Revolt of the Angels in his novel Tropic of Capricorn.

References

1914 French novels
Angel novels
Novels by Anatole France
War in Heaven